Craig Conn (born November 16, 1983 in St. Catharines, Ontario) is a former professional lacrosse player.

High school career
Conn was a four-year starter at Holy Cross Catholic Secondary School in St. Catharines from 1997 to 2001. During those years, he teamed up with fellow future NLL players Matt Vinc, Billy Dee Smith and Sean Greenhalgh to win two OFSAA field lacrosse championships (1999, 2001). After Conn graduated, many St. Catharines lacrosse players would follow in Conn's footsteps and play for Holy Cross, which would help the school become a lacrosse powerhouse for years.

College career
Conn played for the University of Massachusetts Amherst in 2002 and 2003. However, he would renounce his remaining two years of eligibility to enter the NLL entry draft.

NLL career
Conn was originally drafted by the Vancouver Ravens in the first round (4th overall) of the 2003 NLL Entry Draft. In the 2004 season, he was 4th in team scoring with 39 points and was named to 2004 NLL All-Rookie Team. When the Ravens were removed from the 2005 schedule, a dispersal draft was held, and Conn was taken 1st overall by the Minnesota Swarm.

After only playing half a season with Minnesota, Conn was dealt at the trade deadline to the Arizona Sting for their first round draft picks in 2006 & 2007. Conn led Arizona in scoring with 19 points during their playoff run to the 2005 Championship game. Conn also helped lead Arizona to the 2007 Championship game, before losing to the Rochester Knighthawks.

Prior to the 2008 season, the Sting announced that they would not play in 2008, and another dispersal draft was held. Conn was selected by the Buffalo Bandits despite suffering a major knee injury during the summer that sidelined him for the entire 2008 season. The Sting would have retained Conn's rights if they returned in the 2009 season.  However, the Sting ceased operations and another dispersal draft was held. Conn, never having played a game in a Bandits uniform, was selected fourth overall by the Toronto Rock.

After one season with the Rock, Conn was traded along with a second round draft pick to the Calgary Roughnecks in exchange for two draft picks.

Conn played for the Washington Stealth during the 2011 season and retired after the season.

Canadian Box Career

Junior
Conn made headlines in 1998 when he played with the St. Catharines Jr. B Spartan Warriors at only the age of 14 (the team's head coach was his father, Morris Conn). Conn played 72 games for the St. Catharines Athletics in the OLA Junior A Lacrosse League from 1999 to 2003. In 1999, he was given the Joey Nieuwendyk Award for Rookie of the Year. From 2001 to 2003, Conn lead the Athletics to three straight League championships and two Minto Cup National championships (2001, 2003). He was also a member of the 2004 Minto Cup Champion Burnaby Lakers of the British Columbia Junior A Lacrosse League. He is one of the few players in CLA history to win 3 Minto Cups in 4 years, and is only one of three players (the other being Shawn Evans and Mark Matthews) to win a Minto Cup title in two consecutive years with two different teams.

Senior
In the WLA draft, Conn was selected 2nd overall by the New Westminster Salmonbellies. During the 2007 season, Conn sufferered a major knee injury while playing with the Salmonbellies during the Western Lacrosse Association's playoffs. This would cause Conn to miss the entire 2008 NLL season as well as the 2008 WLA season. Conn made his return to Senior lacrosse in 2009 with the Six Nations Chiefs of Major Series Lacrosse. Conn returned to the Salmonbellies for the 2010 season where he played in the Mann Cup, losing to the Peterborough Lakers. Conn retired from Senior lacrosse after the season.

Statistics

NLL
Reference:

Canadian Lacrosse Association

References

External links
Bio from University of Massachusetts web site

1983 births
Arizona Sting players
Calgary Roughnecks players
Canadian expatriate lacrosse people in the United States
Canadian lacrosse players
Lacrosse forwards
Lacrosse people from Ontario
Living people
Minnesota Swarm players
National Lacrosse League All-Stars
Sportspeople from St. Catharines
Toronto Rock players
UMass Minutemen lacrosse players